Springmont is a census-designated place in Spring Township, Berks County, Pennsylvania, United States.  It is located along U.S. Route 422 near the community of West Wyomissing.  As of the 2010 census, the population was 724 residents.

References

Populated places in Berks County, Pennsylvania